The 1901–02 team went 1–0 the first and only undefeated season in school history. It was the first year for head coach Clayton T. Teetzel. The team captain was C.H. Ireland and the team manager was W.A. Whitney.

Roster

Schedule
EMU Media Guide has Detroit YMCA and the Detroit Free Press has Detroit College of Medicine. 

|-
!colspan=9 style="background:#006633; color:#FFFFFF;"| Non-conference regular season

References

Source: 

Eastern Michigan Eagles men's basketball seasons
Michigan State Normal